Jai Swaminarayan (also spelled Jay Swaminarayan) (Devnagari: जय स्वमिनारायन, Jaya Svaminārāyan ;Gujarati:જય સ્વામીનારાયણ, Jaya Svāmīnārāyaṇ) is a notable religious term used in the Swaminarayan Sampraday for both ritual and social purposes. It is used not only as a "hello" but also as a "goodbye". The idea being any thing you say or start, has to start with the God's name. People from this sect of Swaminarayan use it to start a phone conversation and end it. They use it to begin and end the congregation. People following other faiths use their own god's name for e.g. Jai Sri Krishna or Jai Ganesha. The literal meaning of the term is, "Hail Swaminarayan." Within the Swaminarayan Sampraday, the term is used as a greeting.  Presently this term is used in daily puja rituals worldwide at the Swaminarayan Sampraday.

References

Swaminarayan Sampradaya